Sir Edmund Shaa or Shaw (died 20 April 1488) was a London goldsmith, Sheriff of London in 1475 and Lord Mayor of London in 1482.  Shaa lent money to Edward IV and, as mayor (at least), was extensively involved in the coronation of Edward IV's brother Richard III.  He was later knighted and made a member of the Privy Council.

Family
Edmund Shaa, the son of John Shaa of Dukinfield, Cheshire, is said to have been born in the district of Mottram in Longdendale, Cheshire. He was the brother of Ralph Shaa, and the uncle of Sir John Shaa (died c. 1503), Lord Mayor of London in 1501. Lord Mayor of London. His granddaughter, Julian Browne, was the second wife of Sir John Mundy, Lord Mayor of London.

Career
In 1450 Shaa was apprenticed to a London goldsmith, probably Robert Butler. He completed his apprenticeship in 1458, and in 1462 was appointed engraver to the Royal Mint at the Tower of London and Calais. He held the office for the next twenty years.

Shaa was mayor in interesting times.  It is sometimes stated that Shaa's brother, Ralph Shaa, preached against the legitimacy of Edward IV's marriage and that Shaa (as mayor) offered the crown to Richard III. Shaa is a character in William Shakespeare's play Richard III. Sir John Shaa, the first 16th century Lord Mayor, was his nephew, while Sir William Browne (d. 3 June 1514), Lord Mayor in 1513, was his son-in-law. He was knighted in 1483.

Shaa made his will on 20 March 1488, and died 20 April 1488. He was buried in the Mercers' chapel in the church of St Thomas of Acon. In 1506 his son-in-law, Thomas Rich, was his surviving executor.

Amongst numerous legacies at his death was a sum to found a grammar school at Stockport, where his parents had been buried. He is commemorated by a Blue Plaque on Church Brow, Mottram.

Marriage and issue
Shaa married, by 1471, a wife named Julian (d. July 1494), whose surname is unknown, by whom he had a son and two daughters:

Hugh Shaa, who died without issue.
Margaret Shaa, who married a London mercer, Thomas Rich, the son of John Rich (d. 29 July 1458) by his wife Isabel, and grandson and heir of Richard Rich (d.1463-4), Sheriff of London in 1441. Margaret Shaa's husband, Thomas Rich, was alive in 1506, but had died by 1513; in the will of Margaret's brother-in-law, Sir William Browne, dated 29 May 1513, she is described as 'Margaret Riche, widow'.
Katherine Shaa, who after her father's death married Sir William Browne (d. 3 June 1514), Lord Mayor of London in 1513, son and heir of Sir John Browne, Lord Mayor of London in 1480, and cousin of Sir William Browne, Lord Mayor of London in 1507. By Sir William Browne, Katherine had a son, William. After the death of Katherine (née Shaa), Sir William Browne married Alice Keble, the daughter of Henry Keble, Lord Mayor of London in 1510, by whom he had two sons, John and Matthew, and two daughters, Anna and Elizabeth.

See also
 List of Sheriffs of the City of London
 List of Lord Mayors of London

Notes

References

External links
Will of Sir Edmund Shaa, goldsmith and alderman and late mayor, of Saint Thomas Acres, City of London, proved June 1488, PROB 11/8/187, National Archives Retrieved 21 June 2013
Will of Dame Julyan Shaa, widow, of Colchester, Essex, proved 20 July 1494, PROB 11/10/214, National Archives 22 June 2013
Will of Hugh Shaa, proved 18 March 1492, PROB 11/8/657, National Archives Retrieved 21 June 2013
Will of Sir John Shaa or Shaw, alderman and goldsmith, of Saint Thomas Acres, City of London, proved 13 May 1504, PROB 11/14/156, National Archives Retrieved 21 June 2013
Will of William Browne, Alderman of Saint Thomas Acon, City of London, proved 1 July 1514, PROB 11/17/567, National Archives Retrieved 22 June 2013
Will of Sir John Browne, Alderman of Saint Mary Magdalen Milk Street, City of London, proved 25 January 1498, PROB 11/11/307, National Archives Retrieved 22 June 2013
Will of William Browne, alderman, of City of London, proved 6 June 1508, PROB 11/16/19, National Archives Retrieved 22 June 2013
Will of Richard Riche, mercer, of Saint Lawrence, Old Jewry, London, proved 16 August 1464, PROB 11/5/84, National Archives Retrieved 30 June 2013
Will of Thomas Ryche, mercer, of London, proved 4 October 1475, PROB 11/6/296, National Archives Retrieved 30 June 2013
The Ancestry of Oliver Mainwaring: Shaa Retrieved 21 June 2013
Thurrock Heritage Factfiles: 45 The Horndon Woolmarket Retrieved 21 June 2013
Stockport Retrieved 22 June 2013

1488 deaths
People from Mottram in Longdendale
English goldsmiths
Sheriffs of the City of London
Year of birth unknown
Knights Bachelor
15th-century lord mayors of London
Members of the Privy Council of England